Early Years, Vol. 1 is an album by American musician Hank Williams, Jr. This album was released on October 6, 1998, on the Curb Records label.

Track listing
 "I'm Not Responsible"  – 3:24
 "How's My Ex Treating You"  – 3:02
 "You're Gonna Change (Or I'm Gonna Leave)"  – 3:57
 "All by Myself"  – 3:06
 "One Night Stands"  – 4:12
 "Tennessee"  – 2:22
 "Once and for All"  – 3:17
 "Mobile Boogie"  – 2:35
 "Storms Never Last"  – 3:28
 "It's Different with You"  – 3:06

External links
 Hank Williams, Jr's Official Website
 Record Label

Hank Williams Jr. compilation albums
1998 compilation albums
Curb Records compilation albums